The Men's points race competition at the 2018 UCI Track Cycling World Championships was held on 2 March 2018.

Results
160 laps (40 km) were raced with 16 sprints.

References

Men's points race
UCI Track Cycling World Championships – Men's points race